The United States Army Air Assault School, officially the Sabalauski Air Assault School (TSAAS), is a Army Forces Command Table of Distribution and Allowances unit located at Fort Campbell, Kentucky. Its primary task is training leaders and soldiers assigned to the 101st Airborne Division (AASLT), other United States Army units, and United States Armed Forces service members.  The school is named for Command Sergeant Major Walter James Sabalauski.

Air Assault School teaches several courses annually. The rigorous, fast-paced training is known as the 10 (or 11) toughest days in the United States Army. About 15 percent of the class does not make it through the first day, dubbed Zero day, which includes a demanding obstacle course. More fail to make it past sling load testing in phase two. Ultimately, only about 55 percent fail to graduate.

Background 
Air Assault School qualifies soldiers to conduct airmobile and air assault helicopter operations, including aircraft orientation, sling load operations, proper rappelling techniques and fast-rope techniques. On the morning of graduation, students must complete a 19 km (12-mile) march with rucksack in under three hours before receiving their wings.

The original school is located at Fort Campbell, Kentucky (home of the 101st Airborne Division). There are also or have been schools at:
 Fort Rucker, Alabama
 Schofield Barracks, Hawaii 
 Fort Hood, Texas 
 Fort Bliss, Texas  
 Camp Blanding, Florida  
 Fort Benning, Georgia 
 Fort Drum, New York
 Fort Ord, California
 Fort Riley, Kansas 
 Fort Richardson, Alaska 
 Fort Wainwright, Alaska
 Fort Belvoir, Virginia
 Fort Bragg, North Carolina
 Camp Gruber, Oklahoma
 West Point, New York
 Fulda Army Airfield, Germany

Instructors at the course are referred to as Air Assault Sergeants. Open to men and women, the school is composed of learning helicopter insertion techniques, pathfinder operations, sling load operations as well as rappelling from buildings, cliffs and helicopters. Each day begins with rigorous physical training that includes unit runs from 3.2 to 8 km (2 to 5 miles). Attention to detail and tedious packing lists, the contents of which are carried in a 16 kg (35-pound) ruck sack daily, are also the order of the day; one missing item from these lists or failing any task from any phase of the course, could cause the student to be dropped from the school immediately.

Courses offered at the Air Assault School include:  Air Assault, Pathfinder, Pre-Ranger , Rappel Master and Fast Rope Insertion Extraction System (FRIES)/Special Purpose Insertion Extraction (SPIES) Master courses.  TSAAS is also home to the Division's Parachute Demonstration Team.

The 101st Airborne Division, a parachute and glider-borne unit that conducted two jumps during World War II, was converted to an Airmobile unit in 1968 in Vietnam, becoming the 101st Airborne Division (Airmobile).  The parenthetical designation changed to Air Assault in late 1974. According to popular myth, the Airborne tab over the unit's Screaming Eagle shoulder patch remained because two of the division's units, a parachute rigger detachment and a pathfinder company, were both still on jump status. There is, however, no basis for this under AR 670–1, Wear and Appearance of Army Uniforms and Insignia. According to The Institute of Heraldry, the Airborne tab is "an intrinsic part of shoulder sleeve insignia", not a detachable insignia added if a unit is on jump status, and according to its records the unit is still designated the 101st Airborne Division. There are numerous other non-parachute units with subordinate parachute units, such as long range surveillance troops (company equivalents) within battlefield surveillance brigades, but their presence does not entitle entire brigades to wear the Airborne tab. Regarding the division's remaining parachute units, it now has one pathfinder company in each of its two aviation brigades, but the rigger unit was separated from the division many years ago. Until late 2013, parachute rigger support was provided by the locally assigned 4th Platoon of the Fort Bragg-based 647th Quartermaster Company. In October 2013 jump status for the two pathfinder companies was terminated, leaving no parachute positions within the division, and the rigger platoon departed from the post. In 2015 the 159th Combat Aviation Brigade was inactivated, along with its pathfinder company, and in 2016 the pathfinder company of the Combat Aviation Brigade, 101st Airborne Division (formerly the 101st Combat Aviation Brigade) was inactivated as well. This left the 101st with the same configuration as the 10th Mountain Division, a light infantry unit.

Graduation from the Air Assault School is not required to be a soldier in the 101st, but it is looked upon as an achievement of excellence by the chain of command.

In 1998, a  tower was completed and Phase Three began to train at this site. On 17 December 1999, the new Sabalauski Air Assault School facility was dedicated and for the first time in several years all phases of instruction were conducted at one facility. Over sixty classes are run annually, training over 8,000 soldiers per year.

Training 

Air Assault School is a 10  day course that teaches air assault techniques and procedures, and qualifies soldiers to wear the Air Assault Badge.

Day Zero 
Soldiers are not considered "Air Assault Students" until after successful completion of Zero, the first day of the course, which requires students to complete an obstacle course, two-mile (3.2 km) run, and extensive physical training.

Inspection 
This inspection is extremely meticulous. It is conducted after the 9.7 km (6 mile) foot-march on day one. Soldiers must have all items on the packing list each student is given, with each item clean and serviceable (in usable condition).  If a soldier is missing any item during the inspection, that soldier will be immediately dropped from the course. The inspection has a very specific lay-out that the soldier must adhere to. Every item must be placed exactly how the Air Assault instructors have displayed the items, and all items must be laid out "as worn."

Obstacle course and two-mile run 

The obstacle course is designed to assess a student's upper body strength, agility, endurance, confidence, and ability to perform at heights without displaying fear or distress.  This test is critical in determining if a student will be able to complete Air Assault School without becoming a safety risk to themselves, instructors, or other students during the tough and demanding training events conducted throughout the course. There are nine total obstacles. There are two obstacles that are considered mandatory, and failing either will result in being dropped from the course. The other seven are minor obstacles, and the Air Assault prospect is allowed to fail one of the seven and still continue. This means that failing two of the minor obstacles will result in being dropped from the course.

Prior to the obstacle course, students will conduct a two-mile (3.2 km) run.  Students must complete the run in under 18:00 to receive a "GO" in the event (meaning satisfactory completion of the event).  The uniform for the run is Army Combat Uniform (ACU – minus the ACU Top depending on the season in which the training cycle begins) with running shoes.

Phase One – Combat Assault

Phase One, the Combat Assault Phase, is three days long.  During this phase, soldiers receive instructions on the following tasks:
Aircraft Safety 
Aircraft Orientation – includes the familiarization of the characteristics and capabilities of Army aircraft
Aero Medical Evacuation – includes the capabilities and request procedures for MEDEVAC aircraft
Pathfinder Operations – HLZ selection, marking and operation for day and night missions involving multiple aircraft, to include sling loads
Hand-and-arm signals –  soldiers are taught 17 hand-and-arm signals used during sling load operations 
Close Combat Attacks – use of attack in a close air support (CAS) role
Combat Assault Operations – includes various factors encompassed in an air assault operation such as: components of an air assault mission, the reverse planning sequence, duties and responsibilities of platoon-level personnel during an air assault, static load training, and a simulated combat assault on UH-60 aircraft
Soldiers are given two tests:   
Written – The written test consists of 50 multiple-choice questions.  Soldiers must achieve 70 percent to receive a "GO" on the written test.   
Hands-on – Students are tested on 10 of 16 hand-and-arm signals and must correctly perform seven of the 10 to receive a "GO".   Soldiers must pass both tests to move on to the Sling Load Phase.  They are allowed one retest per exam.

Phase Two – Slingload Operations

Phase Two, Slingload Operations, is three days long.  During the Sling Load Phase, soldiers receive instruction on various aspects of sling load operations.  This includes:
Planning and preparation for sling load operations
Capabilities, characteristics, and use of sling load equipment
Duties and responsibilities of sling load personnel
Familiarization with sling load theory and rigging of non-standard loads
Students receive hands-on training on preparation, rigging, and inspection of several certified or suitable external loads.  These may include the following loads:   
M1097 HMMWV   
M1097 HMMWV, shotgun/side-by-side configuration   
M1151 HMMWV
M119 105mm Howitzer 
M149A2 Water Trailer
A-22 Cargo Bag
Fuel Blivets (one, two, three, or four blivit configuration)  
2,250 kg (5000 lbs) or 4,500 kg (10,000 lbs) Cargo Net   
The soldiers will also conduct an actual hook-up of a load underneath a CH-47 or UH-60 aircraft. 
In this phase, soldiers are given two tests:   
Written – The written test consists of 50 multiple-choice questions.  Soldiers must achieve 70 percent to receive a "GO" on the written test.   
Hands-on – Students are tested on four of the six loads taught.  Students must identify three out of four preparation and/or rigging deficiencies within two minutes per load to receive a "GO".  
Soldiers must pass both tests to move on to the next phase.  They are allowed one retest per exam.

Phase Three – Rappelling Phase

Phase Three, the Rappelling Phase is three days long.  During this phase, soldiers receive instruction on basic ground and aircraft rappelling procedures, to include the following tasks:   
Tying of the hip-rappel seat (Swiss seat)
Hook-up techniques 
Lock-in procedures   
Rappel with and without combat equipment
Belay procedures 
Fast Rope familiarization
Soldiers will conduct two rappels on the wall side of the school's  tower, 9 to 12 rappels from the open side, and two additional rappels from a UH-60 Blackhawk helicopter hovering at 21–27 m (70–90 ft).  All rappels are conducted with and without combat equipment.  During fast rope familiarization, students conduct a controlled descent and a static hold for five seconds.  Students that successfully conduct both descents from a  platform then descend from the  tower using the stack-out/rapid exit technique.  Fast rope descents are conducted without combat equipment.
Soldiers are tested on:   
Tie the Hip rappel (Swiss) seat (the 90 second time limit has been reinstated)   
Hook-up to a rappel rope without deficiency (the 15 second time limit has been reinstated)
Conduct three rappels: lock-in rappel, rappel without combat equipment (also known as a "Hollywood" rappel) with three controlled brakes, and combat equipment rappel with three controlled brakes

Soldiers must pass all tests to move on to the next phase and are allowed one retest per exam. The standards of this course are so strict because failure to master the skills increases the chances of an accident significantly. The margin for error in this type of training is small.

12-mile ruck march
The final event is the  ruck march.  Soldiers must complete the  ruck march with the prescribed uniform and equipment in three hours or less in order to graduate. The ruck march is a graded task and a graduation requirement for Air Assault School. Upon completion of the ruck march, Soldiers must do a layout of all items in the packing list. Failure to have 100% of the items results in a failure and not being able to graduate.

Graduation
Graduates are awarded the Air Assault Badge and the 2B ASI (Additional Skill Identifier) unless they did not come out of the helicopter qualified to inspect rigged sling loads.
Graduates in the rank of Corporal (E-4) and above are qualified to perform as rappel lane NCOs for ground rappel training and are eligible to attend the Rappel Master Course.  
Graduates in the rank of Sergeant First Class (E-7) or above are qualified to serve as a rappel site Safety Officer for ground and aircraft rappelling.

See also
 United States Army Pathfinder School
 Battle of Signal Hill
 Battle of Ia Drang
 United States Army Reconnaissance and Surveillance Leaders Course
 United States Army Airborne School

References

External links
CNN Transcript: Air Assault School, 10 Toughest Days in the Army
The Sabalauski Air Assault School Homepage
Fort Campbell Homepage

United States Army schools